Japan Japan (Hebrew: יפאן יפאן, Japanese:日本日本) is a 2007 film directed by Lior Shamriz, starring Imri Kahn.

Cast

Plot 
The film tells the story of Imri, who at 19 goes to live in Tel Aviv, but dreams of moving to Japan. Through his relationships and encounters and in diverse cinematic tools, we are introduced to the young man's life. An exploration of living in the exotic city of Tel Aviv is presented through a hero who is himself in the midst of exploring his own choice of an exotic place. A unique correlation is formed between the hero's misconception of Japan and ours of him. The movie was constructed by both improvised and pre-scripted scenes, as required by the nature of each scene.

Production
The film was reportedly produced for as little as US$200, with volunteer actors and no additional crew. Nevertheless, it was presented at some prestigious venues around the world such as the Locarno Film Festival, the New York Museum of Modern Art, the Buenos Aires Independent Film Festival, and more than fifty film festivals. Due to dozens of copyright violations, the film has not been commercially released. It is, however, well distributed through the underground network of illegal art distribution.

Critical reception
The film received polar reviews from the critics, ranging from cutting edge, brilliant  to the horror of video when it falls into the wrong hands. The film was named by MoMA chief curator as one of the top ten films of 2008.

The filmmaker said about the film: "One interesting challenge was how to create an interesting viewing experience in a film where it is impossible for the viewer to experience the film through the hero's eyes. As the hero says himself: 'Whoever looks at me, expects to see the drama or the thoughts, but the face is empty."

See also
 Lior Shamriz filmography

References

External links 
Official site

Japan Japan at Yahoo! Movies
Review by Bill Weber - at Slant Magazine

2007 films
2007 drama films
Israeli avant-garde and experimental films
Films set in Tel Aviv
Israeli LGBT-related films
English-language Israeli films
Films about LGBT and Judaism
2007 directorial debut films
Israeli drama films
2000s avant-garde and experimental films
2007 LGBT-related films